|}

The Pretty Polly Stakes is a Listed flat horse race in Great Britain open to three-year-old fillies. It is run over a distance of 1 mile and 2 furlongs (2,012 metres) on the Rowley Mile at Newmarket in late April or early May.

History
The event is named after Pretty Polly, the winner of the fillies' Triple Crown in 1904. It was established in 1962, and was originally staged at Newmarket's mid-May fixture. It was moved to early May in 1973.

The Pretty Polly Stakes sometimes serves as a trial for the Epsom Oaks. The last horse to win both races was Taghrooda in 2014.

The race is held on the same day as the 1000 Guineas at Newmarket's two-day Guineas Festival meeting.

Records

Leading jockey (9 wins):
 Frankie Dettori – Pricket (1996), Siyadah (1997), Melikah (2000), Mot Juste (2001), Hi Dubai (2003), Marie de Medici (2010), Jazzi Top (2015), Swiss Range (2016), Lah Ti Dar (2018)

Leading trainer (8 wins):
 Henry Cecil – Flirtigig (1972), Cloonagh (1973), Sing Softly (1982), Sandy Island (1984), Indian Skimmer (1987), Sardegna (1990), All at Sea (1992), Midnight Line (1998)

Winners since 1977

Earlier winners

 1962: Military Pickle
 1963: Fair Astronomer
 1964: Young Man's Fancy
 1965: Miba
 1966: Orabella II
 1967: Cranberry Sauce
 1968: Celina
 1969: Borana
 1970: Royal Pancake
 1971: Fleet Wahine
 1972: Flirtigig
 1973: Cloonagh
 1974: Lauretta
 1975: Val's Girl
 1976: Spiranthes

See also
 Horse racing in Great Britain
 List of British flat horse races

References

 Paris-Turf:
 Racing Post:

 pedigreequery.com – Pretty Polly Stakes – Newmarket.

Flat horse races for three-year-old fillies
Newmarket Racecourse
Flat races in Great Britain
1962 establishments in England
Recurring sporting events established in 1962